The 183rd Aviation Regiment is an aviation regiment of the U.S. Army.

Structure
 1st Battalion (Assault Helicopter) (ID ARNG)

References

183